79th is a station on the Chicago Transit Authority's 'L' system, serving the Dan Ryan branch of the Red Line. The station is located in the median of the Dan Ryan Expressway. It was the first station on the Dan Ryan branch to feature an elevator for accessibility. The station's location is between the Greater Grand Crossing and Chatham neighborhoods.

79th closed from May 19, 2013, to October 20, 2013, for the Red Line South Reconstruction Project.

Bus connections 
CTA
  8A South Halsted 
  24 Wentworth (Weekdays only) 
  29 State  
  75 74th/75th 
  79 79th (Owl Service)

Notes and references

Notes

References

External links 

 Train schedule (PDF) at CTA official site
 79th/Dan Ryan Station Page at Chicago-L.org
79th/Dan Ryan Station Page CTA official site
79th Street entrance from Google Maps Street View

CTA Red Line stations
Railway stations in the United States opened in 1969